Hadriwa may refer to the following places in Bavaria, Germany:

Settlements

 Hadriwa (Nittenau), village in the borough of Nittenau, county of Schwandorf
 Hadriwa (Elisabethszell), abandoned hamlet in the former municipality of Elisabethszell

Mountains
 Hadriwa (Bavarian Forest, Haibach), 922 m, in the Bavarian Forest, county of Straubing-Bogen
 Hadriwa (Bavarian Forest, Zell), 677 m, in the Bavarian Forest, county of Cham